Kyeon Mi-ri (born January 27, 1965) is a South Korean actress and singer. She is best known for her role as the antagonist Lady Choi in the hit period drama Dae Jang Geum (2003).

Career 
Kyeon Mi-ri graduated from Seoul Traditional Arts High School in 1983, then studied Dance at Sejong University. She made her acting debut in 1984, and has since become active in television dramas, most notably as the arrogant and ambitious Lady Choi in the 2003 period drama Dae Jang Geum (or Jewel in the Palace), which was a hit not only in Korea but throughout Asia.

In 2009, she ventured into the music industry and released her first album titled Happy Women, consisting of mainly trot songs.

Personal life
Kyeon married actor Im Young-gyu in 1987, and they divorced in 1993.

Kyeon remarried in 1998, to businessman Lee Hong-heon. They have one son, Lee Ki-baek. Lee Hong-heon legally adopted Kyeon's two daughters from her first marriage, and they took on his surname; Lee Yu-bi and Lee Da-in are both actresses. Kyeon is also a part of the Hwanggan Kyeon clan, which makes her a descendant of Gyeon Hwon, who was the first king of the Hubaekje kingdom, during the Later Three Kingdoms of Korea.

In 2009, Kyeon was investigated for stock manipulation, with her husband Lee suspected of insider trading. Kyeon denied any wrongdoing, saying she was simply an investor.

Filmography

Television

Film

Theater

Discography

Awards

References

External links 
 
 
 

South Korean television actresses
South Korean film actresses
South Korean stage actresses
South Korean women singers
Sejong University alumni
1965 births
Living people